Pseudochariesthes is a genus of longhorn beetles of the subfamily Lamiinae, containing the following species:

 Pseudochariesthes nigroguttata (Aurivillius, 1908)
 Pseudochariesthes nobilis (Jordan, 1894)
 Pseudochariesthes plena (Jordan, 1903)
 Pseudochariesthes superba Breuning, 1962

References

Tragocephalini